Millangoda Raja, also known as Millangoda tusker, was a Sri Lankan elephant. Over 9 feet tall and with 7 and a half foot long tusks, he was (wrongly) considered the longest tusked Asian elephant during his lifetime, as there were much longer tusks in other individuals. In fact, several other Asian elephants with crossed tusks sported 8-10 foot (2.5-3m) long tusks. The tusker was one of the main casket bearers of the procession of Esala, an annual procession held to pay homage to the Sacred Tooth Relic of Buddha, held in Kandy, Sri Lanka.

History
Raja was captured at Nawagaththegama jungles in Anamaduwa, Puttalam District in 1945 when he was a calf elephant around the age of 3-4 years. In Raja's herd nineteen elephants were captured, 15 of them were sold in Anamaduwa Wev Pitiya. Thereafter he was owned by M. R. A. Millangoda Appuhamy of Molagoda, Kegalle. Appuhamy brought five six-foot tall, eight year old small elephants, out of which, one was left where the small elephant was Millangoda Raja. 

The height of the Millangoda Raja is about 9 feet. The tusks are 7 feet 6 inches long. According to the owner, he was gigantic and majestic in appearance had never been aggressive except during must season. The tusker was known to had a fond of eating jaggery and toffees. Two mahouts have taken care of Raja.

Perahera procession
Millangoda Raja has participated in the Esala Perahera in Kandy for about 40 years. Raja first participated in the Perahera of the Maha Vishnu Devalaya in Kandy. Thereafter he has participated in the Esala Perahera as an elephant in the trunk of the elephant carrying the casket. Raja had the opportunity to carry the casket of the Tooth for about 10-12 years. After the death of the Raja elephant in Kandy, the Millangoda Raja got that opportunity. Raja last visited the Perahera procession in 2008.

Death
Raja's tusks gradually began to grow, and as he got older tusks grew to the point where he could not collide with the ground. When he lowered his head to eat, tusks hit the ground which made it very difficult for Raja to eat. He was suffering from food indigestion for over one year. That's because the elephant's teeth fall out as it ages. At the same time the elephant has been weakened. At that time, the herdsmen had mentioned that when they he was sick, he was given figs, leaves and jackfruits to eat. It is said that the then President Mahinda Rajapaksa gave him energy foods through the Wildlife Department.

When the elephant was in the last stage of his life, many bottles of saline with vitamins had to be given. Before the death, prith was chanted. After showing the Atapirikara to the elephant, it was gently touched and presented to the Buddhist monks. After the Pirith sermon and the tying of the Pirith strings, the elephant greeted the monks with great effort. The tusker died on 30 July 2011 at 12.25 pm and was about 73 years old at the time of his death. He was given funeral rites by a team of Buddhist monks. 

After his death the body of Millangoda Raja was preserved and placed on public display in a museum, which was constructed by Ananda Millangoda at the Elephant Village in Molagoda, Kegalle. For this purpose, with the guidance of Dr. Nanda Wickramasinghe, who was the Director of the National Museum, the assistance of museum dermatologists has been obtained. Millangoda Raja's dermatologist was Ravindra Wickramanayake, a dermatologist at the National Museum Department. The department's artists, L.A. R. Wijepala and L. P. Mahinda also helped for the taxidermy process.

See also
 List of individual elephants

References

Individual elephants
2011 animal deaths
Individual animals in Sri Lanka
Elephants in Sri Lanka